The Albuquerque New Mexico Temple is the 73rd operating temple of the Church of Jesus Christ of Latter-day Saints (LDS Church).

History
The intent to build the temple was announced on April 4, 1997, by church president Gordon B. Hinckley during the church's general conference. It was to be the first temple in the state of New Mexico. Ground for the Albuquerque New Mexico Temple was broken in a special ceremony on June 20, 1998. About 6,500 members attended the event which had a 600-voice youth choir provide the music.

During a 10-day open house prior to dedication about 70,000 people toured the Albuquerque New Mexico Temple. LDS Church president Gordon B. Hinckley dedicated the temple on March 5, 2000. During the dedicatory prayer, Hinckley expressed his hope that the new temple would turn the hearts of the LDS members to their families.

The Albuquerque New Mexico Temple serves about 55,000 members in New Mexico and bordering parts of Arizona and Colorado. The exterior is finished with desert rose pre-cast concrete and trimmed with Texas pearl granite. A gold statue of the angel Moroni tops the single-spire.

In 2020, along with all the church's other temples, the Albuquerque New Mexico Temple was closed in response to the coronavirus pandemic.

See also

 Comparison of temples of The Church of Jesus Christ of Latter-day Saints
 List of temples of The Church of Jesus Christ of Latter-day Saints
 List of temples of The Church of Jesus Christ of Latter-day Saints by geographic region
 Temple architecture (Latter-day Saints)
 The Church of Jesus Christ of Latter-day Saints in New Mexico

Additional reading

References

External links
 
Albuquerque New Mexico Temple Official site
 Albuquerque New Mexico Temple at ChurchofJesusChristTemples.org

20th-century Latter Day Saint temples
Buildings and structures in Albuquerque, New Mexico
Temples in New Mexico
Temples (LDS Church) completed in 2000
Temples (LDS Church) in the United States
The Church of Jesus Christ of Latter-day Saints in New Mexico
Tourist attractions in Albuquerque, New Mexico
2000 establishments in New Mexico